Probata espinosai is a species of sea snail, a marine gastropod mollusk in the family Mitridae, the miters or miter snails.

Description

Distribution
This marine species occurs off Cuba.

References

 Sarasúa H. (1978). Especies nuevas de Mitridae (Mollusca: Neogastropoda). Poeyana. 180 1-9.

Mitridae
Gastropods described in 1978